Laze is a small settlement between Leskovica and Robidnica in the Municipality of Gorenja Vas–Poljane in the Upper Carniola region of Slovenia.

References

External links

Laze on Geopedia

Populated places in the Municipality of Gorenja vas-Poljane